Paul Leroy "Ox Blood" Howard (September 20, 1895 – February 18, 1980) was an American jazz saxophonist and clarinetist.

Early life
Howard was born in Steubenville, Ohio on September 20, 1895. He began on cornet, and also played oboe, bassoon, flute, and piano, but concentrated on tenor sax.

Later life and career
After moving to Los Angeles in 1911, he got early professional experience with Wood Wilson's Syncopators in 1916, Satchel McVea's Howdy Band, and Harry Southard's Black and Tan Band. Howard played in the bands of both King Oliver and Jelly Roll Morton when they toured California. He first recorded with the Quality Four in 1922-23, then played with Sonny Clay in 1925 before forming his own group, the Quality Serenaders, later that year. Among his sidemen were Lionel Hampton and Lawrence Brown (trombone). They played at Sebastian's Cotton Club from 1927 to 1929 and recorded for Victor Records before disbanding in 1930, when Les Hite picked up some of the members. Howard subsequently played with Ed Garland, Freddie Washington, Hampton again in 1935, Eddie Barefield (1936–37), Charlie Echols, and his own ensembles, including one that held a residence at Virginia's in Los Angeles from 1939 to 1953. He played throughout the 1950s. He died in Los Angeles on February 18, 1980.

Recording sessions
Howard's band participated in only 6 recording sessions:

April 16, 1929, Hollywood
50830-1-2 Overnight Blues - Victor rejected
50831-1-2-3 Quality Shout - Victor rejected

April 28, 1929, Culver City
50868-1 The Ramble - Victor V-38068 and Bluebird B-5804
50869-2 Moonlight Blues - Victor V-38068
50870-2 Charlie's Idea - Victor V-38070 and Victor 22001

April 29, 1929, Culver City
50830-4 Overnight Blues - Victor V-38070 and Victor 22001
50831-5 Quality Shout - Victor V-38122
50877-1 Stuff - Victor V-38122 and Bluebird B-5804

October 21, 1929, Culver City
54477-1-2 Harlem - Victor rejected
54478-1-2 Cuttin' Up - Victor rejected

February 3, 1930, Culver City
54477-3 Harlem - Victor 23354
54478-3 Cuttin' Up - Victor 23420
54585-1 New Kinda Blues - Victor 22660
54586-2 California Swing - Victor 23354

June 25, 1930, Hollywood
54847-3 Burma Girl - Victor rejected (released on a Victor LPM-10117 LP)
54848-1 Gettin' Ready Blues - Victor 23420

Source:

References

1895 births
1980 deaths
American jazz saxophonists
American male saxophonists
American jazz bandleaders
King Records artists
20th-century American conductors (music)
20th-century American saxophonists
Jazz musicians from Ohio
20th-century American male musicians
American male jazz musicians